Mario Mantovani (born 28 July 1950, in Arconate) is an Italian politician. 

His daughter is the deputy of the Brothers of Italy Lucrezia Mantovani.

Early life and career
Mantovani graduated in foreign languages and literature in 1975. From 1981 to 1986 he was director of the Padre Beccaro Institute in Milan.

In 1990 he founded the Sodalitas non-profit organization, which in Bellaria-Igea Marina has a series of residences and summer camps.

In 1996 he opened the Mantovani Foundation, specialized in the construction and management of nursing homes for the elderly. With his appointment as undersecretary in 2008 he leaves the presidency of the Mantovani Foundation, leaving the guide to his family.

Mantovani owns the Immobiliare Vigevanese company, as well as the Mantovani Foundation. With the first he builds social welfare residences and with the second he manages four RSAs in the province of Milan which, added to those led by Sodalitas, make eleven structures and 830 beds, all accredited in the Lombardy region rankings. It also manages 13 day care centers for the disabled managed on behalf of the ASL of Milan 1.

Political activity

Member of the European Parliament 
In 1999 he was elected MEP among the ranks of Forza Italia with 39,000 preferences and was re-elected in 2004 with 50,000 preferences. He sat in the European People's Party group. In 2008 he was elected to the Senate and left the seat in the European Parliament to Iva Zanicchi.

Mayor of Arconate 
In 2001 he was also elected mayor of Arconate with 51% of the votes and was re-elected in 2006 with 68% of the votes. In November 2008, the municipal councilors that supported Mantovani resigned to allow him to reapply for the third consecutive time for mayor. He was reconfirmed mayor of Arconate in the municipal elections of 2009 with 66% of the votes. In May 2015 he resigned as municipal councilor.

Senator and Undersecretary for Infrastructure and Transport 
In 2008 he was elected Senator and was appointed Undersecretary for Infrastructure and Transport in the Berlusconi IV Cabinet.
From 29 January 2011 he became the new regional coordinator of The People of Freedom in Lombardy, succeeding the resigning Guido Podestà, president of the Province of Milan.

In the 2013 general elections he was re-elected to the Senate of the Republic. Also elected to the Regional Council of Lombardy, he resigned as Senator due to incompatibility on 3 June 2013.

Vice-president and assessor in the Lombardy Region 
Following the regional elections in Lombardy in 2013, he was elected regional councilor on the PdL list, being the most voted among all the candidates with almost 13,000 preferences.

He was subsequently appointed by the president Roberto Maroni as vice president of the Lombardy Region and Assessor for health.

On 1 September 2015, after the regional health reform with the creation of the super-department between Health and Welfare, he left the regional health department (which will be governed ad interim by President Maroni) for the delegation of regional councilor for Relations with European Union, Community Planning and International Relations, until 13 October 2015.

In December 2016 he joined Daniela Santanchè's movement We Republicans – Sovereign People. He follows the party colleague also in January 2018, leaving his party, Forza Italia, and joining the movement led by Giorgia Meloni, Brothers of Italy.

Judicial proceedings 
On 13 October 2015, he was arrested in Milan, accused of corruption, bid-rigging, and misdirection of public funds for school construction and patients needing dialysis transport, between 2012 and 2014, while Vice President of Lombardy.

In 2019 he has been sentenced to five years and six months for corruption, extortion and auction disruption.

References

External links
 
 

1950 births
Living people
People from the Province of Milan
Forza Italia MEPs
MEPs for Italy 2004–2009
MEPs for Italy 1999–2004
Forza Italia politicians
The People of Freedom politicians
Forza Italia (2013) politicians
Brothers of Italy politicians